Single Santa Seeks Mrs. Claus is a 2004 film starring Steve Guttenberg, Crystal Bernard and Dominic Scott Kay.

A sequel, Meet the Santas, was released in 2005.

Plot

A single mother whose faith in love died with her former husband learns that Christmas miracles can still happen in director Harvey Frost's warmhearted tale of winter magic. Beth Sawtelle (Crystal Bernard) is a devoted single mother and advertising executive whose current campaign could put her on the fast track to the big time. The holiday season is here, and in order to sell the latest in video game technology, Beth's campaign needs the perfect Santa Claus. As Beth burns the midnight oil night after night and attempts to convince her young son Jake (Dominic Scott Kay) never to have faith in fantasies, the wistful young man pens a letter to Santa asking for a new dad for the holidays. It seems that up in the North Pole the time has come for Saint Nick to pass along the seasonal responsibilities to his son Nick (Steve Guttenberg), but in order to take the position, Nick must have a Mrs. Claus before Christmas Eve. Upon receiving the Christmas request from young Jake, Nick sets his sights on Los Angeles, and Beth Sawtelle in particular. Despite his best intentions, it's going to take more than a Christmas miracle to convince the dejected widow that love can still conquer all.

Cast

 Steve Guttenberg - Nick Claus
 Crystal Bernard - Beth Sawtelle
 Dominic Scott Kay - Jake Sawtelle
 Armin Shimerman - Ernest
Wendy Braun - Amy
Sebastian Tillinger - Hennesy 
Mackenzie Fitzgerald - Jocelyn
Kelley Hazen - Joanie
 Cody Arens - Christian
Robin Shorr - Meredith
John Wheeler - Santa Claus
Taffy Wallace - Coach
Samantha Bennet - Marilyn
Ashlynn Bernard - Young Beth Sawtelle
Katia Coe - Holly
Marcia Ann Burrs - Mrs. Claus
Miranda Gibson - Emily
Hanna Wilbur - Deaf Girl
Austin Miles - Mail Santa
Clement Von Franckenstein - Sir John
 Darby Stanchfield - Store Clerk
Diane Robin - Woman Customer
Erik Carr - Connor
Alison McMillan - Mom of Deaf Girl
Frank Sharp - Tree Seller
 Thomas Calabro - Andrew West

See also
 List of Christmas films
 Santa Claus in film

External links 

2000s romance films
2004 television films
2004 films
American Christmas films
American television films
Christmas television films
Films directed by Harvey Frost
Films scored by Mark Watters
2000s Christmas films
Santa Claus in film